The Lent Bumps 2010 was a series of rowing races held at Cambridge University from Tuesday 23 February 2010 until Saturday 27 February 2010. The event was run as a bumps race and was the 123rd in the series of Lent Bumps which have been held annually in late-February or early March in this form since 1887. See Lent Bumps for the format of the races. In 2010, 122 crews took part (69 men's crews and 52 women's crews) with nearly 1100 participants in total.

Head of the River crews

  men rowed over each day to retain the headship for a fourth consecutive year.

  women bumped  on the first day to retake the headship they had held since 2007.

Highest 2nd VIIIs

  finished as the highest placed men's second VIII, although they fell three places in the second division.

  finished as the highest placed women's second VIII, bumping up two places over the four days.

Links to races in other years

Bumps Charts

Below are the bumps charts all 4 men's and all 3 women's divisions, with the men's event on the left and women's event on the right. The bumps chart represents the progress of every crew over all four days of the racing. To follow the progress of any particular crew, simply find the crew's name on the left side of the chart and follow the line to the end-of-the-week finishing position on the right of the chart.

Note that this chart may not be displayed correctly if you are using a large font size on your browser. A simple way to check is to see that the first horizontal bold line, marking the boundary between divisions, lies between positions 17 and 18. The combined Hughes Hall/Lucy Cavendish women's crews are listed as Lucy Cavendish only.

Lent Bumps
Lent Bumps results
Lent Bumps
Lent Bumps